K213 or K-213 may refer to:

K-213 (Kansas highway), a former state highway in Kansas
HMS Poppy (K213), a former UK Royal Navy ship
Divertimento No. 8 for winds in F major by Mozart, K.213